In Search of Janáček (Czech: Hledání Janáčka) is a film about the life of composer Leoš Janáček.

The film, written and directed by Petr Kaňka, received Special Mention at the International Television Festival Golden Prague in 2003. It was released in 2004 to celebrate 150 years anniversary of Janáček. The director combined archive footage and contemporary stagings.

The film reflects the complicated character of Janáček (performed by Hanuš Bor), his work and his relationship with his wife (Ilona Svobodová) and his mistress Kamila Stösslová (Zuzana Vejvodová). It presents Janáček developed as a visionary of musical realism through the use of a specific musical language. The director tried to avoid any stereotypes of the composer. The film reveals his rather tough childhood, an early parting with parents and various conflicts, as well as hard work, self-education, and a desire for creation.

External links 
 

2003 television films
2003 films
2000s Czech-language films
Czech biographical films
Films about classical music and musicians
Films about composers
2000s biographical films
2000s Czech films